Madison Brengle is the defending champion, but chose not to participate.

Nao Hibino won the title defeating Samantha Crawford in the final, 6–2, 6–1.

Seeds

Draw

Finals

Top half

Bottom half

Resources 
 Main Draw
 Qualifying Draw

Kentucky Bank Tennis Championships - Women's Singles
2015 WS